Canadian International School of Phnom Penh is an international school in Phnom Penh, Cambodia.

It has three campuses: Koh Pich (Diamond Island), the Bassac Garden Preschool, and the Olympia City Preschool. The Koh Pich campus is in Chamkar Mon Section, the Bassac Garden Preschool is in Chamkar Mon Section, and the Olympia City Preschool is in Prampir Makara Section.

History
It was established in 2012. Initially it only had preschool grades.

Construction on the main campus began in 2013. It opened the Koh Pich campus in 2015. The following year the Tuol Kork preschool opened. This campus was in the Sunway Tuol Kork.

The Olympia City preschool opened in 2019.

It is in the process of adding grades, with grade 12 to be added circa 2022.

References

External links
 Canadian International School of Phnom Penh

International schools in Phnom Penh
Canadian international schools in Cambodia